The 1897–98 Scottish Division One season was won by Celtic by four points over nearest rival Rangers.

League table

Results

References 

 Scottish Football Archive

1897–88 Scottish Football League
Scottish Division One seasons